The Wanggao warty newt (Paramesotriton fuzhongensis) is a species of salamander in the family Salamandridae found only in northeastern Guangxi, China, in Zhongshan, Fuchuan and Gongcheng counties. Its natural habitats are subtropical or tropical moist lowland forests, subtropical or tropical seasonally wet or flooded lowland grassland, and rivers.
It is threatened by habitat loss.

References

Paramesotriton
Amphibians described in 1989
Endemic fauna of China
Amphibians of China
Taxonomy articles created by Polbot